Davis County Courthouse may refer to:

Davis County Courthouse (Iowa), in Bloomfield
Davis County Courthouse (Utah), in Farmington